Gabe Jacas (born May 27, 2004) is an American college football outside linebacker for the Illinois Fighting Illini.

Early life and high school career
Jacas grew up in Port St. Lucie, Florida and attended Fort Pierce Central High School. In addition to playing football, he won two state titles in wrestling. Jacas was rated a three-star recruit and originally committed to play college football at Tulane during the summer before his senior year. He later flipped his commitment to Illinois after coach Bret Bielema received a tip from an area scout and offered him a scholarship.

College career
Jacas was named a starter at outside linebacker entering his freshman season with the Illinois Fighting Illini.

References

External links
Illinois Fighting Illini bio

Living people
Players of American football from Florida
American football linebackers
Illinois Fighting Illini football players
Year of birth missing (living people)